Charles  Jim Beckett (born July 25, 1958) is an American lawyer and politician. He was a member of the Mississippi House of Representatives from the 23rd District, being first elected in 2002. He is a member of the Republican party. He resigned from the House on September 22, 2022, after Governor Tate Reeves appointed him executive director of the Mississippi Public Utilities Staff.

References

1958 births
Living people
Republican Party members of the Mississippi House of Representatives
21st-century American politicians
People from Bruce, Mississippi